Aluminium foil (or aluminum foil in North American English; often informally called tin foil) is aluminium prepared in thin metal leaves with a thickness less than ; thinner gauges down to  are also commonly used. The foil is pliable, and can be readily bent or wrapped around objects. Thin foils are fragile and are sometimes laminated with other materials such as plastics or paper to make them stronger and more useful.

Approximately 75% of aluminium foil is used for packaging of foods, cosmetics, and chemical products, and 25% is used for industrial applications (e.g., thermal insulation, electrical cables, and electronics). It can be easily recycled.
 
Aluminium foil supplanted tin foil in the mid 20th century. In the United Kingdom and United States it is often informally called "tin foil", just as steel cans are often still called "tin cans". Metallised films are sometimes mistaken for aluminium foil, but are actually polymer films coated with a thin layer of aluminium. In Australia, aluminium foil is widely called alfoil.

History

Before aluminium foil
Foil made from a thin leaf of tin was commercially available before its aluminium counterpart. Tin foil was marketed commercially from the late nineteenth into the early twentieth century.  The term "tin foil" survives in the English language as a term for the newer aluminium foil. Tin foil is less malleable than aluminium foil and tends to give a slight tin taste to food wrapped in it.  Tin foil has been supplanted by aluminium and other materials for wrapping food.

The first audio recordings on phonograph cylinders were made on tin foil.

Invention
Tin was first replaced by aluminium in 1910, when the first aluminium foil rolling plant, Dr. Lauber, Neher & Cie. was opened in Emmishofen, Switzerland. The plant, owned by J.G. Neher & Sons, the aluminium manufacturers, was founded in 1886 in Schaffhausen, Switzerland, at the foot of the Rhine Falls, whose energy powered the process. In December 1907, Neher's sons, along with Dr. Lauber, had invented the endless rolling process, by which they discovered that aluminium foil could be used as a protective barrier.

In 1911, Bern-based Tobler began wrapping its chocolate bars in aluminium foil, including the unique triangular chocolate bar, Toblerone. 

The first use of foil in the United States was in 1913 for wrapping Life Savers, candy bars, and gum.

Manufacture 

The continuous casting method is much less energy intensive and has become the preferred process. For thicknesses below , two layers are usually put together for the final pass and afterwards separated which produces foil with one bright side and one matte side. The two sides in contact with each other are matte and the exterior sides become bright; this is done to reduce tearing, increase production rates, control thickness, and get around the need for a smaller diameter roller.

Properties 

Aluminium foil has a shiny side and a matte side. The shiny side is produced when the aluminium is rolled during the final pass. It is difficult to produce rollers with a gap fine enough to cope with the foil gauge, therefore, for the final pass, two sheets are rolled at the same time, doubling the thickness of the gauge at entry to the rollers. When the sheets are later separated, the inside surface is dull, and the outside surface is shiny. This difference in the finish has led to the perception that favouring a side has an effect when cooking. While many believe (wrongly) that the different properties keep heat out when wrapped with the shiny finish facing out, and keep heat in with the shiny finish facing inwards, the actual difference is imperceptible without instrumentation. Increased reflectivity decreases both absorption and emission of radiation. Foil may have a non-stick coating on only one side. The reflectivity of bright aluminium foil is 88% while dull embossed foil is about 80%.

Uses

Aluminium foil is widely sold into the consumer market, often in rolls of  width and several metres in length.

Electromagnetic shielding 
Although aluminium is non-magnetic, it is a good conductor, so even a thin sheet reflects almost all of an incident electric wave. At frequencies more than 100 MHz, the transmitted electric field is attenuated by more than 80 decibels (dB) (less than 10−8 = 0.00000001 of the power gets through).

Thin sheets of aluminium are not very effective at attenuating low-frequency magnetic fields.  The shielding effectiveness is dependent upon the skin depth. A field travelling through one skin depth will lose about 63 per cent of its energy (it is attenuated to 1/e = 1/2.718... of its original energy).  Thin shields also have internal reflections that reduce the shielding effectiveness.

Cooking 
Aluminium foil is also used for barbecuing delicate foods. 

As is the case with all metallic items, aluminium foil reacts to being placed in a microwave oven. This is because of the electromagnetic fields of the microwaves inducing electric currents in the foil and high potentials at the sharp points of the foil sheet; if the potential is sufficiently high, it will cause electric arcing to areas with lower potential, even to the air surrounding the sheet.  Modern microwave ovens have been designed to prevent damage to the cavity magnetron tube from microwave energy reflection, and aluminium packages designed for microwave heating are available.

Environmental issues 

Some aluminium foil products can be recycled at around 5% of the original energy cost.

See also
 Tin foil hat
 Gold leaf

References

External links 

 European Aluminium Foil Association
 Aluminium Association (USA)
 Aluminium Foil from How Products Are Made, vol. 1, Thomson Gale (2005).
 How It's Made: Aluminium Foil - HowItsMadeEpisodes channel on YouTube.

Food preparation utensils
Aluminium
Packaging materials
Metalworking
Swiss inventions
Aluminum objects